Emille Davie Lawrence is a mathematician specializing in topological graph theory. She is Term Associate Professor and Chair of Mathematics and Statistics at the University of San Francisco.

Education and career

Lawrence received her BS in Mathematics from Spelman College and her PhD in Mathematics from the University of Georgia in 2007. Her dissertation was jointly supervised by Clint McCrory and Will Kazez. She is a low-dimensional topologist with mathematical interests that include braid groups, geometric group theory, and spatial graphs. She is also an advocate for broadening participation in the mathematical sciences through outreach and mentoring. She is Editor-In-Chief for the American Mathematical Society's blog Math Mamas.

Awards and honors

In 2021, Lawrence received the Association for Women in Mathematics (AWM) Service Award "for her service as Chair of the 50th Anniversary Committee and her leadership role as Chair, since 2016, of the Mentor Network Committee and for her mentorship as Founding Faculty Sponsor of the AWM Student Chapter at the University of San Francisco. In all of these roles, Emille has worked to increase participation in the AWM by a diverse population of mathematicians at all stages of their careers." 

In 2021, Lawrence was awarded a Karen Edge Fellowship and was featured on the AWM website Women Do Math.

References 

Living people
Year of birth missing (living people)
Spelman College alumni
University of Georgia alumni
University of San Francisco faculty
American mathematicians
American women mathematicians